Gary and Jerri-Ann Jacobs High Tech High Charter School, often referred to as High Tech High (HTH), is a public charter high school in San Diego, California, United States. The school is now one of several schools operated under the High Tech High charter schools umbrella organization.

History

Beginning in 1998, forty public and corporate partners, led by current board chair Gary Jacobs, began meeting to discuss the current state of education in San Diego. Faced with a shortage of workers for the locally strong high tech and biotech industries, the group wondered why the local school system was not better able to produce more qualified workers. Having given money to the school district in the past and questioning the return on that investment, these local entrepreneurs decided to open a new high school and christened it High Tech High.

Soon thereafter, longtime educator Larry Rosenstock was asked to present to this group about different possible governance structures for the school. He then became the founding principal of the school, and is now the C.E.O. of the network of schools.

The school was founded in September 2000 with 200 students and currently educates 527 students.

High Tech High occupies a building on the former Navy Training Center in the Point Loma area, which is now known as Liberty Station. The school is organized that on a project-based learning model (most learning comes from multi-subject projects, rather than the more traditional approach, where teachers talk and students listen), real-world connection, personalization, and having a common intellectual mission (no ability grouping). Together with several of the other HTH schools, the school is called the "High Tech High Village", which most students simply call "The Village".

Methodology
At the High Tech High schools, the method of teaching is based on "project-based learning", in which students are given a project which involves working independently or in groups and doing research to complete it. Some classes have projects where grades from different subjects will be all part of the same project.

Projects the students have worked on include designing a human-powered submarine, genetic manipulation, designing a water treatment plant, writing a book on the Harlem Renaissance, creating a sitcom and building a robot out of old computer parts.

All students complete internships in the junior year. These internships are currently a three-week immersion experience working full-time at various places such as website companies, biotech firms, non profits, and other schools.

Financing
The schools are primarily publicly funded. The Bill and Melinda Gates Foundation contributed a one-time gift of $1000 per student when the school opened, and has pledged millions of dollars to build more schools following the model over the next four years. Some are already in operation. Financial support to develop the original HTH also came from Gary Jacobs, son of Qualcomm founder Irwin Jacobs. Jacobs also donated almost 9 million dollars in building space for three of the schools in the village.

FIRST Robotics (The Holy Cows)
The school is home to one of thirty FIRST Robotics Competition teams in San Diego County. The school's team, named  The Holy Cows, is nationally recognized.

Athletics

Cross Country/Track & Field
The High Tech High cross country team, known as the Storm, competes in San Diego CIF sanctioned meets and invitationals. They are 2007-2016 reigning Frontier League champions. During the summer and fall seasons, the team practices long distance training for the cross country season, and in the winter and spring months they shift focus to track & field. The team qualified for the CIF State Cross Country Meet in 2014 and 2016.

Water polo
Although the school has minimal funding for athletics, a water polo team was started in 2009. The team includes both female and male athletes, although it is predominantly male.

Women's basketball
A women's basketball team competes and has both a junior varsity and varsity team.

Men's basketball
A men's basketball team competes and has both a junior varsity and varsity team.

Women's rugby
Begun in 2010, a women's rugby team competes and has both a junior varsity and varsity team.

Men's rugby
Started in 2010, a men's rugby team competes and has both a junior varsity and varsity team.

Women's soccer
High Tech High's women's soccer program was founded in 2008. Since its start, the women's team has won the Frontier League 2008, 2010, and 2011, competing in the CIF playoffs 2010 and 2012. In 2012, after becoming runner-up in the Frontier League, the team was awarded a seed in the CIF playoffs and made it past the first round after a dramatic victory over High Tech High Chula Vista.

Men's soccer
Men's soccer is one of High Tech High's most decorated sports, competing in the Frontier League and winning this league in 2008, 2009, 2010, and making appearances in CIF playoffs all three years.

Women's tennis
A women's tennis team competes in the Frontier League as well as CIF matches.

Men's tennis
A men's tennis team competes in the Frontier League as well as CIF matches.

Results

The school has had over 600 visitors, including US state Governors Gray Davis (California), Tom Ridge (Pennsylvania), Bill Owens (Colorado), and Senator Joe Lieberman, in its first year alone. Other visitors include Peter Yarrow, Arnold Schwarzenegger, Kathleen Kennedy Townsend, Eli Broad, Secretary of Commerce Carlos M. Gutierrez, and Bill Richardson, and Jesus Rubalcaba. On February 15, 2006, Bill Gates and Oprah Winfrey made an appearance on their education tour.

The central High Tech High Learning organization (with support from the Bill and Melinda Gates Foundation) has since opened several middle schools and high schools using the original HTH model:

High Tech High International, San Diego
High Tech High Media Arts, San Diego
High Tech High North County, San Marcos, California
High Tech Los Angeles, Los Angeles
High Tech Middle, San Diego
High Tech Middle Media Arts, San Diego
City High School, Tucson, Arizona
Explorer Elementary Charter School, San Diego
Mirta Ramirez Computer Science Charter School, Chicago, Illinois
New Bedford Global Learning Charter School, New Bedford, Massachusetts
New Urban High School, Clackamas, Oregon

Formerly there was also a High Tech High Bayshore, in Redwood City.

References

External links
High Tech High FIRST Robotics Team
Forbes article on High Tech High School: "Where Everyone Can Overachieve"
High Tech High website
High Tech High MUN website

High Tech High charter schools
Coalition of Essential Schools
High schools in San Diego
Charter high schools in California
2000 establishments in California